Events from the year 1705 in Sweden

Incumbents
 Monarch – Charles XII

Events

 16 July - Battle of Gemauerthof
 21 July - Battle of Warsaw (1705)
  
 
 18 November – Pace between Sweden and Poland in the Treaty of Warsaw (1705). 

 - The Maria Johansdotter case.

Births

 
 22 February - Peter Artedi, naturalist  (died 1735)

 
 - Carl Wilhelm Cederhielm, courtier  (died 1769)

Deaths

 8 February - Beata Magdalena Wittenberg, courtier  (born 1644)
 
 12 April - Henrik Florinus,  priest, writer and translator (born 1633)

References

External links

 
Years of the 18th century in Sweden
Sweden